Mary Cuddie (1823–1889) was a New Zealand farmwife, midwife and shopkeeper. She was born in Maybole, Ayrshire, Scotland on 1823. She moved to New Zealand following Thomas Burns, eventually settling in Saddle Hill. With her sons, she opened a general store in Mosgiel.

References

1823 births
1889 deaths
New Zealand midwives
Scottish emigrants to New Zealand
19th-century New Zealand businesspeople
19th-century New Zealand businesswomen